Pitohui is a genus of birds endemic to New Guinea. The birds formerly lumped together as pitohuis were found by a 2008 study that examined their evolutionary history on the basis of the genetic sequences to have included birds that were quite unrelated to each other. They have since been separated into other genera.

Taxonomy and systematics
The genus Pitohui was introduced in 1831 by the French naturalist René Lesson. Lesson omitted to specify the type species but this was designated as the northern variable pitohui by Richard Bowdler Sharpe in 1877. The genus name is a Papuan word for the variable pitohui.

The common group name pitohui includes several species of birds that were all historically classified in the genus Pitohui. But now they have been separated into three families and multiple genera. The genus Pitohui in its strict sense is now placed in the family Oriolidae, while the other pitohui genera have been placed in the families Oreoicidae and Pachycephalidae.

Species
Four species are recognized in the revised genus Pitouhi:

Former species
Species that were formerly sometimes placed in the genus Pitohui include the following:
 Crested pitohui (Ornorectes cristatus, Family Oreoicidae, formerly placed as Pitohui cristatus)
 Black pitohui (Melanorectes nigrescens, Family Pachycephalidae, formerly placed as Pitohui nigrescens)
 White-bellied pitohui (Pseudorectes incertus, Family Pachycephalidae, formerly placed as Pitohui incertus)
 Rusty pitohui (Pseudorectes ferrugineus, Family Pachycephalidae, formerly placed as Pitohui ferrugineus)
Morningbird (Pachycephala tenebrosa, Family Pachycephalidae, formerly placed as Pitohui tenebrosus or as Colluricincla tenebrosa)

References

 

Oriolidae
Bird genera
Endemic fauna of New Guinea
Taxa named by René Lesson